Wang Luna (born 7 August 1980) is a Chinese former swimmer who competed in the 1996 Summer Olympics and in the 2000 Summer Olympics.

References

1980 births
Living people
Chinese female freestyle swimmers
Olympic swimmers of China
Swimmers at the 1996 Summer Olympics
Swimmers at the 2000 Summer Olympics